Narsaarsuk (old spelling: Narssârssuk) is an abandoned settlement on the edge of Bylot Sound in northern Greenland near Thule Air Base. The site of the former settlement is contaminated with plutonium after the 1968 Thule Air Base B-52 crash.

References 

Ghost towns in Greenland
Former populated places in Greenland